Charlie Mole is a British/French film and television score composer and songwriter. His scores include An Ideal Husband, Othello, The Importance of Being Earnest, The Diary of Anne Frank, the 2007 and 2009 versions of St. Trinian's,  the 2009 version of Dorian Gray, and the 2013 ITV drama series Mr Selfridge, for which he was Emmy nominated.

He had a music scholarship to New College, Oxford, Oxford University, where he was a member of the band "Kudos Points" which provided the dance tracks for the Oxford University Film Foundation production of the Hugh Grant film Privileged. The band achieved a record deal whilst the members were still students.

He then went on to sign a deal with Warner-Chappell as a songwriter for ten years before turning to film score composing.

His song credits include Chaka Khan "Never Miss the Water" which was nominated for a Grammy Award, Kylie Minogue "Surrender", Angie Stone Black Diamonds & Pearls Album, Ultra Naté "Time of our Lives", Lisa Stansfield and Girls Aloud.

References

External links

British composers
English film score composers
English male film score composers
Living people
Year of birth missing (living people)